Çiçek (means "flower") is a Turkish  name (female) and surname. Notable people with the surname include:

 Cemil Çiçek, Deputy Prime Minister of Turkey
 Ilhami Çiçek, Turkish poet
 Ali Ekber Çiçek, Turkish folk musician

Turkish-language surnames